Gor Minasyan (born 25 October 1994) is an Armenian-born Bahraini weightlifter, and Olympic silver medalist (2016) competing in the super-heavyweight category (105 kg + until 2018 and 109 kg + starting in 2018 after the International Weightlifting Federation reorganized the categories).

Career
He was the youth world record holder for the snatch in the +94 kg division till middle of 2018 when new bodyweight category announced. Minasyan won a silver medal at the 2010 Summer Youth Olympics.

Minasyan was banned for 2 years in 2013 after testing positive for norandrosterone.

He was the bronze medalist at the 2015 World Weightlifting Championships, and the silver medalist at the 2016 European Weightlifting Championships, 2017 European Weightlifting Championships, 2018 World Weightlifting Championships, and the  2016 Summer Olympics.

In 2021, he won the bronze medal in the men's +109 kg event at the World Weightlifting Championships held in Tashkent, Uzbekistan.

He won the gold medal in the men's +109kg event at the 2022 Asian Weightlifting Championships held in Manama, Bahrain.

Major results

References

External links
 
 
 

1994 births
Living people
Armenian sportspeople in doping cases
Armenian male weightlifters
Doping cases in weightlifting
Weightlifters at the 2010 Summer Youth Olympics
Weightlifters at the 2016 Summer Olympics
World Weightlifting Championships medalists
Olympic weightlifters of Armenia
Medalists at the 2016 Summer Olympics
Olympic silver medalists for Armenia
Olympic medalists in weightlifting
Universiade medalists in weightlifting
Sportspeople from Gyumri
Universiade gold medalists for Armenia
European Weightlifting Championships medalists
Ethnic Armenian sportspeople
21st-century Armenian people